Chris Johnson may refer to:

Entertainment
Chris J. Johnson (born 1977), American actor
Chris Johnson (presenter) (born 1991), BBC television presenter
Christopher Johnson, fictional alien refugee from the film District 9

Sports

American football
Christopher Johnson (American football executive), American businessman and sports executive
Chris Johnson (cornerback) (born 1979), American football cornerback
Chris Johnson (running back) (born 1985), American football running back
Chris Johnson (safety, born 1960), American football strong safety
Chris Johnson (safety, born 1971), American football free safety

Australian rules football
Chris Johnson (footballer, born 1976), Australian rules footballer for Fitzroy and Brisbane
Chris Johnson (footballer, born 1986), Australian rules footballer for Melbourne and Carlton

Baseball
Chris Johnson (baseball) (born 1984), American third and first baseman
Kris Johnson (baseball) (born 1984), American pitcher

Basketball
Chris Johnson (basketball, born 1985), American forward/center from Louisiana State University who has played in the NBA
Chris Johnson (basketball, born 1990), American forward/guard from University of Dayton who has played in the NBA
Kris Johnson (basketball) (born 1975), American forward/guard from University of California, Los Angeles (UCLA) who played overseas

Other sports
Chris Johnson (boxer) (born 1971), Jamaican boxer
Chris Johnson (rugby league), rugby league footballer of the 1980s for Great Britain, Leigh, and Swinton
Chris Johnson (rugby union) (born 1986), English rugby union footballer
Christa Johnson (born 1958), American professional golfer
Christopher Johnson (Canadian football) (born 1991), Canadian football linebacker

Other
Christopher Louis McIntosh Johnson (1931–2012), British journalist and economist
Christopher R. Johnson (born 1960), professor of computer science at the University of Utah
Christopher W. Johnson (born 1965), professor of computing science at the University of Glasgow
Chris Johnson (Maine politician), American politician from Maine
Chris Johnson (Mississippi politician), American politician from Mississippi
Christopher Johnson (surgeon) (1782–1866), British surgeon and Mayor of Lancaster in 1832
Chris Johnson (architect), British architect that designed "The Doughnut", the headquarters of the GCHQ (Government Communications Headquarters)
Chris Johnson (artist),  American fine art photographer,  professor of photography at the California College of the Arts.
Chris Johnson (game developer), Australian game developer and one of the creators of Moirai

See also
Christopher Johnston (disambiguation)
Christine Johnson (disambiguation)